Kirkella is an unincorporated hamlet in southwestern Manitoba, Canada.  The community was founded on the main line of the Canadian Pacific Railway in 1898.  Kirkella was the name of the farm of local pioneer Thomas Watson, which in turn derived its name from Kirk Ella, a village in the East Riding of Yorkshire, England.

It is located in the Rural Municipality of Wallace, approximately 103 kilometers (64 miles) west of Brandon.

References

Unincorporated communities in Westman Region